Touchstone for Manu is a jazz compilation album by Manu Katché. This album was released in the label ECM Records in August 2014.

Composition
On this album, Manu Katché is joined in performances of his tunes by Jan Garbarek, Tomasz Stanko, Nils Petter Molvaer, Trygve Seim, Mathias Eick, Marcin Wasilewski, Tore Brunborg and Jacob Young.

Reception
John Kelman in his review for All About Jazz says that "Touchstone for Manu puts a very fine period on an eight-year run that positioned Katché as a strong bandleader, an accessible composer...and a drummer whose focus on groove and group interplay over chops and excessive gymnastics remains both refreshing and relevant."

Track listing
ECM Records – ECM 2419.

Personnel
Manu Katché – drums
Jan Garbarek – tenor saxophone
Tomasz Stanko – trumpet
Marcin Wasilewski – piano
Slawomir Kurkiewicz – double bass
Trygve Seim – tenor saxophone
Mathias Eick – trumpet
Jacob Young – guitar
Pino Palladino – bass
Jason Rebello – piano
Jim Watson – piano, Hammond B3 organ
Tore Brunborg – saxophone, tenor saxophone
Nils Petter Molvaer – trumpet, loops

References

ECM Records albums
2014 albums
Albums produced by Manfred Eicher